Thurlaston may refer to:

Thurlaston, Leicestershire
Thurlaston, Warwickshire

See also 
 Thurcaston
 Thurmaston
 Thurvaston